Andrés Medina Aguirre (born March 23, 1978) is a Colombian football player.

External links
 Profile - El Gráfico 
 Andrés Medina at playmakerstats.com (English version of ceroacero.es)

1978 births
Living people
Association football defenders
Colombian footballers
Cortuluá footballers
Coronel Bolognesi footballers
Alianza Petrolera players
Nejapa footballers
San Salvador F.C. footballers
Santa Tecla F.C. footballers
Once Municipal footballers
Atlético Balboa footballers
Colombian expatriate footballers
Expatriate footballers in Peru
Expatriate footballers in El Salvador
Footballers from Barranquilla